Garfield Gonsalves (born 2 September 1972) is an Antiguan and Barbudan footballer, currently playing for Villa Lions.

International career
Nicknamed Garry, the versatile Gonsalves is a veteran with the national team, making his debut for Antigua and Barbuda in an April 1992 World Cup qualification match against the Netherlands Antilles and has earned over 25 caps since. He played in 11 World Cup qualification games.

In 2006 Gonsalves also became head coach of the Antigua and Barbuda U-16 national team.

National team statistics

References

External links

1972 births
Living people
Antigua and Barbuda footballers
Antigua and Barbuda international footballers
Association football defenders